Ememem is an anonymous French street artist based in Lyon. They create mosaics incorporating geometric motifs in cracked sidewalks and façades, a process they call flacking. Ememem creates art at night, so that it is generally discovered at dawn.

Art 
A street artist, Ememem creates mosaics incorporating geometric motifs in cracked sidewalks and façades. They describe this art as "a poem that everybody can read" and "a memory notebook of the city". They created their first mosaic in 2011 in an alley in their hometown of Lyon, although they had already been working with ceramic; since 2016, they have created street mosaics across France, and  also in Barcelona (including in the Plaça Urquinaona and Sant Antoni) and Madrid as well as Turín, Genova, Civitacampomarano, and Terracina in Italy, Oslo, Hamar and Stavanger in Norway, Melbourne, Aberdeen in UK and Carlow in Ireland.

Their mosaics can easily be found in Lyon, and some visitors to the city seek them out.

In addition to their street art, they have created additional commissions for exhibitions, some of which have been purchased by art collectors.

Ememem describes their art as flacking, a self-coined neologism derived from the French , meaning "puddle" or "pool". They have cited  by Jean Dubuffet as an influence.

Personal life 
They told Ynet that the name "Ememem" refers to the sound of their moped, which they ride when they go to create a mosaic. They work at night to remain anonymous, and their identity is unknown; their work is generally found at dawn. They have refused requests for in-person or radio interviews, and declined to state their age or gender. They share images of their work on Instagram with the account "@ememem.flacking", which had more than 147,000 followers .

See also 
 Jim Bachor

Notes

References

External links 
 
 

The Guardian gallery of mosaics by Ememem

Living people
Year of birth missing (living people)
Mosaic artists
Street artists
21st-century French artists
Artists from Lyon
Anonymous artists